Yanagawa Nobusada was a designer of ukiyo-e Japanese woodblock prints in Osaka who was active from about 1822 to 1832.  His teacher, Yanagawa Shigenobu, gave him the name Yanagawa Yukinobu.  A print from 1823 records the latter's name change from Yukinobu (雪信) to Nobusada (信貞).

References
 Keyes, Roger S. & Keiko Mizushima, The Theatrical World of Osaka Prints, Philadelphia, Philadelphia Museum of Art,1973, 271.
 Lane, Richard. (1978).  Images from the Floating World, The Japanese Print. Oxford: Oxford University Press. ;  OCLC 5246796
 Ujlaki, Peter, Woodblock Prints, Faux Zen Kabuki, Daruma Magazine, No. 60, 53, 2008.

Ukiyo-e artists